Old Wingate is a small village in County Durham, in England. It is situated a short distance to the west of Wingate. Most of the village was deserted in the Middle Ages.

Villages in County Durham
Wheatley Hill